André Chorda (20 February 1938 – 18 June 1998) was a French football defender. He played for France in the FIFA World Cup 1966.

Titles
French championship in 1959 with OGC Nice

References
Profile on French federation official site

1938 births
1998 deaths
French footballers
France international footballers
Association football defenders
OGC Nice players
FC Girondins de Bordeaux players
Ligue 1 players
1960 European Nations' Cup players
1966 FIFA World Cup players